Staromusino (İśke Musa) is a rural locality (a village) and the administrative centre of Staromusinsky Selsoviet, Karmaskalinsky District, Bashkortostan, Russia. The population was 580 as of 2010. There are 8 streets.

Geography 
Staromusino is located 17 km west of Karmaskaly (the district's administrative centre) by road. Novomusino is the nearest rural locality.

References 

Rural localities in Karmaskalinsky District